The Cathedral Church of Saint German or Peel Cathedral, rebranded as Cathedral Isle of Man, is located in Peel, Isle of Man. The cathedral is also one of the parish churches in the parish of the West Coast, which includes the town of Peel. Built in 1879–84, it was made the cathedral by Act of Tynwald in 1980.

It is the cathedral church of the Church of England Diocese of Sodor and Man.

History

The patron of the cathedral, St German of Man (not to be confused with Germanus of Auxerre), was a Celtic missionary and holy man who lived from about 410 to 474. St German's Day is celebrated each year on 13 July.

The original cathedral of St German was inside the walls of Peel Castle and was built sometime in the 12th century when St Patrick's Isle was in the possession of Norse kings. At that time the church followed the Sarum Rite, prevalent throughout much of the British Isles. Around 1333 the Lords of Man refortified St Patrick's Isle and occupied the church as a fortress. In 1392 William Le Scroop repaired the cathedral.

The building fell into ruin in the 18th century. After a considerable period of debate over who owned the ruins and site, it was decided not to rebuild that cathedral. The present building was constructed in 1879–84 to replace St Peter's Church in Peel's market place. In 1895, the bishop consecrated his chapel at the bishop's palace as pro-cathedral and instituted a chapter of canons with himself as dean; by 1960, St Nicholas' chapel was still pro-cathedral (or "Cathedral Chapel"). Bishopscourt's sale in 1976 left the diocese without a cathedral, and forced the issue of choosing a new cathedral; after public consultation, Kirk German Parish Church was so designated, and officially made the cathedral in a service on All Saints' Day (1 November 1980). The arrangement (bishop as dean) persisted even after the consecration of the new cathedral. The bishop was later described by John Betjeman as "that luckless Bishop whose cathedral is a beautiful ruin of green slate and red sandstone on an islet overlooking Peel".

The cathedral has a dean and chapter. Until 15 October 2011, the Bishop of Sodor and Man was dean ex officio, but on that date the vicar of the parish became dean ex officio; this is thought to have been the historical arrangement from the 12th century until the late 19th century. The chapter consists of the Archdeacon of Man ex officio and four canons who are all parochial clergy in the diocese.

St German's Cathedral is the mother church of the Diocese of Sodor and Man, which today consists of only the Isle of Man.

In July 2015, Anne, Princess Royal, attended a thanksgiving service at Peel Cathedral as patron of the development campaign; the service also marked the rebranding of Peel Cathedral as "Cathedral Isle of Man".

Vicars of German

Deans of St German
189515 October 2011: The Bishop of Sodor and Man
15 October 2011present: Nigel Godfrey, Vicar of the West Coast (Dalby, Kirk Michael, Patrick, Peel, and St Johns) since 2012

Chapter
As of 30 December 2020:
Archdeacon of Man and Vicar of Douglas (St George & All Saints) — vacant 
Vicar of Douglas (St Ninian's), Diocesan Communications Officer and Canon of St Patrick — John Coldwell (canon since 2016)
Vicar of Rushen and Canon of St German — Joe Heaton (canon since 2016)
Vicar of Marown and Canon of St Columba — Janice Ward (canon since 2016)

Music

Bishop Hildesley established a children's choir at his private chapel at Bishopscourt as early as 1755. At the opening of Peel New Church in 1884, Ms ML Wood ARCO was appointed the first organist and directed a large choir. The Festival of Nine Lessons and Carols, first established at Truro Cathedral in 1880, made its first appearance in Peel in 1885.

However, the modern Cathedral Choir was re-established in 2012 and includes a mixed boy and girl treble line (aged 7–14 years) drawn from island schools, in addition to a large adult voluntary choir (SATB). Choral services are sung on Sundays and consist of a Choral Eucharist and Choral Evensong.

There is a developing programme of choral scholarships for secondary school students.

The cathedral has a large two-manual Brindley & Foster organ in the chancel. It is planned that the pipe organ will be rebuilt, re-ordered and significantly enlarged over the next five years, to meet the demands of the cathedral's developing choral programme.

Organists and choirmasters
1983 Mike Porter
1986 Bernard Clark
1992 Stephen Dutton
1995 Harvey Easton
2001 Mike Porter

Organists and directors of music
2008 Donald Roworth
2012 Peter Litman

Organ scholars
2015–2016 Jack Oades
2016–2017 Max Smith
2017–2018 Max Smith
2018–2019 Christopher Beaumont
2019–2020 Harry Sullivan

Associate organist
from 2018 Stuart Corrie

References

External links
 Cathedral Isle of Man

Cathedrals in the Isle of Man
Gothic Revival church buildings in the Isle of Man
Diocese of Sodor and Man
Anglican cathedrals in Europe
Peel, Isle of Man
Registered Buildings of the Isle of Man
Church of England church buildings in Europe